The Illinois Routes are the highways in the State Highway System of the U.S. state of Illinois that are not simultaneously part of the Interstate Highway System or the United States Numbered Highway System. These highways are maintained by the Illinois Department of Transportation (IDOT), with the exception of Illinois Route 390 and part of Illinois Route 56, which are maintained by the Illinois State Toll Highway Authority (ISTHA), and all routes that enter the Chicago City Limits are maintained by the Chicago Department of Transportation.

History
Illinois's state route numbers originated in 1918 as State Bond Issues 1 through 46, used to finance the new roads. The numbers of the bond issues were then used to mark the highway routes along the way. Another series of bond issues were authorized in 1924 (47–185) and again were used to mark the roads they paid for. After that the route numbers evolved into a separate system. The State Bond Issue numbers (SBI) remained as inventory designations on the original routes even after the numbered portion was changed, deleted or rerouted. These SBI numbers remain on IDOT district maps to this day and are used along with other designations for bid requests and other official documents.

During the middle part of the 20th century the state numbered routes expanded to new roads around the state. When the United States Numbered Highway System was introduced in the late 1920s many of the new US Routes were already part of the state system and the US number was just added to signposts. During 1930s as the US Highway System matured, redundant state numbers were often removed from US Routes. During 1950s and into 1980s, as the Interstate Highway System started to supplant many US Routes, redundant numbers were removed or replaced with state numbers. After the original Interstate Highways were substantially completed in the early 1970s many state (and US) routes, especially in the Chicago metro area, were removed or shortened as unnecessary.

While US and Interstate systems use even numbers for primary east–west routes and odd for north–south, there is no such rule for Illinois route numbers. Also, three-digit route numbers are usually not related to their one- or two-digit counterpart. There are several exceptions to this however.

General notes
Illinois has used route numbers from IL 1 through IL 186 inclusive as well as many others up to IL 594.

Illinois has used letter suffixes on several state highways, including "A", "B". "C", "N" (for north) and "S" (for south). A, B and C suffixes were used for spurs of a nearby route, the N and S were legs of IL 113 on either side of the Kankakee River.

Illinois has also used special routes, such as "Business", "Alternate", "City", "Bypass" and "Truck" on state-numbered highways. Only a pair of truck routes as well as a batch of Business Routes remain in Illinois, all other special state highways have been renumbered or the markers removed.

Primary routes

Inventory routes

Illinois uses unique "inventory number" signage on rural roads that are owned or maintained by IDOT but may or may not be part of the US or Illinois highway systems. These number signs are white squares, with a green divided circle. The county name is within the dividing line, the mileage from the county line is in the lower half and the inventory or route number in the upper. Number series vary between IDOT Districts, in some areas the number used on otherwise unnumbered routes are a derivative of the former number (i.e.: "913" used on a section of former IL 13) or a sequential number unrelated to the original or former number (such as the 8900 series numbers used in the Galesburg–Macomb area). On many US and Illinois Routes the posted number is used, with or without a preceding descriptor.  These signs are not intended for navigation as route numbers are but rather as guides for IDOT crews and contractors and to identify specific intersections, culverts or other features.

See also

References

External links
http://www.n9jig.com/ Illinois Highways Page]

State routes